Michael Walker  (14 January 1947 – 27 September 2018) was an English mathematician who was instrumental in developing the standards that apply to mobile telecommunications and particularly in respect of the SIM card.

References

1947 births
2018 deaths
Members of the Order of the British Empire
Vodafone people
Academic staff of the University of Tübingen
Scientists from Winchester
Deaths from bronchopneumonia
Deaths from cancer in England
Academics of King's College London
Alumni of Royal Holloway, University of London
English mathematicians
Place of birth missing
Place of death missing